Ahn Sung-ki (born January 1, 1952) is a South Korean actor. One of the country's most respected actors, he has appeared in more than 130 films during his career of over 60 years.

Career
A native of Seoul, Ahn was the son of a veteran filmmaker and producer and started out as a child actor, appearing in director Kim Ki-young's celebrated film The Housemaid (1960). He stopped acting in films to concentrate on his studies but was active in theater as a student at Hankuk University of Foreign Studies. He completed mandatory military service in 1976 as an artillery officer after earning his commission via the Reserve Officers' Training Corps program.

After his discharge, Ahn resumed his acting career. He won recognition in the 1980 film A Fine, Windy Day and was named Best New Actor at the Grand Bell Awards. This was followed by a Best Film Actor Award at the 1982 Baeksang Arts Awards for his role as a Buddhist monk in Im Kwon-taek's critically-acclaimed Mandala, still regarded by critics as one of the best domestic films of all time. Ahn notably shaved his head for the role. Over the years, he began diversifying his repertoire. He and Park Joong-hoon starred in the 1993 hit buddy cop-comedy Two Cops and won the "Daesang" (Grand Prize) at the Baeksang Arts Awards. Their on-screen chemistry as fellow detectives was highly popular with audiences and has been retrospectively dubbed the original on-screen "bromance" of Korean cinema.

Ahn has played the President of South Korea twice, in the movies The Romantic President (2002) and Hanbando (2006). In 2003 Ahn starred in the semi-biographical film Silmido, which also starred several other notable names. It was the first domestic film to sell over 10 million tickets. The phrase "Shoot me and go." uttered by his character became iconic and spawned many parodies and caricatures. He and his Two Cops co-star Park Joong-hoon reunited for the 2006 film Radio Star, directed by acclaimed director Lee Joon-ik. Despite stiff competition from Tazza: The High Rollers, which was released on the same day, it was still a critical and commercial success, with Park and Ahn being nominated for or winning several awards. That year Ahn also starred in the Hong Kong-China period co-production A Battle of Wits alongside top stars Andy Lau and Fan Bingbing. During this period, he was known to be a vocal critic of the halving of screen quotas that allows foreign films to be shown in theaters on certain days, while domestic films are allotted another number of days. At that time he was serving as a committee member in the Korean Film Actors Association's leadership and joined the union's two demonstrations in solidarity with other notable film directors, actors and actresses.

Ahn surprised critics and commentators by appearing in the low-budget semi-biographical 2011 film Unbowed since it had been rejected by major distributors due to its controversial content. It was released to minimal fanfare but quickly became a sleeper hit due to its "David and Goliath" storyline which resonated with viewers. Usually known for portraying warm or fatherly characters, he portrayed a mathematics professor furious at the injustice he suffered at the hands of corrupt judicial officials. The critically-acclaimed film became an unexpected box office hit, earning Ahn awards at the Korean Association of Film Critics Awards and Baeksang Arts Awards.

On August 6, 2021, Ahn signed a contract with Artist Company.

Recognition
A much respected figure in the film industry, Ahn is often dubbed "the nation's actor" (Korean: 국민배우) by the media, although he himself has stated that he prefers being known simply as another film actor. He has been described as an actor "who boasts a truly diverse and vast filmography that changes with the times." He has served as Vice President and President of the Korean Film Actors Association.

In 2008 he received the Nikkei Asia Prize in Culture and Community.

On 23 June 2012, Ahn and Lee Byung-hun became some of the first Korean actors to leave their hand and foot prints on the forecourt of Grauman's Chinese Theatre in Hollywood, Los Angeles. He was recommended by the Korean Film Producers Association for his body of work.

In 2013 Ahn was awarded the Order of Cultural Merit (Eungwan, 2nd Class) by the Ministry of Culture, Sports and Tourism.

Personal life
Ahn is close friends with singer-songwriter Cho Yong-pil. They were childhood friends and schoolmates at the now-defunct Kyungdong Middle School and remained friends even though they attended different high schools.

Ahn married sculptor and university professor Oh So-yeong in 1985 at Myeongdong Cathedral. They have two sons, one of whom married at the same venue the day after his parents' 33rd wedding anniversary. A devout Catholic, Ahn was one of 30 Catholic celebrities who appeared in the 2014 music video for the digital single "Koinonia" to commemorate Pope Francis's visit to South Korea, the first time in 19 years that the pope visited Asia.

Because of his ability to speak several foreign languages, UNICEF appointed Ahn as a representative, and his image is often seen in advertisements on planes travelling to Korea.

Filmography

Film

Awards

Other 
 The Brand Laureate Awards 2021 – Legendary Award 
  29th Korea Culture and Entertainment Awards – Daesang

Baeksang Arts Awards

Blue Dragon Film Awards

Grand Bell Awards

Korean Association of Film Critics Awards

References

External links
 
 

20th-century South Korean male actors
21st-century South Korean male actors
South Korean male film actors
South Korean Roman Catholics
Male actors from Seoul
1952 births
Living people
UNICEF Goodwill Ambassadors
Hankuk University of Foreign Studies alumni
Winners of the Nikkei Asia Prize
Grand Prize Paeksang Arts Award (Film) winners